Frank Gardner was an English footballer who was a co-founder and first secretary/manager of Leicester Fosse.

References

English footballers
Leicester City F.C. players
Year of birth missing
Year of death missing
English football managers
Leicester City F.C. managers
Association footballers not categorized by position